William Legge, 4th Earl of Dartmouth FRS, SA (29 November 1784 – 22 November 1853), styled The Honourable William Legge until 1801 and Viscount Lewisham between 1801 and 1810, was a British peer.

Background
Dartmouth was the son of George Legge, 3rd Earl of Dartmouth, by Lady Frances, daughter of Heneage Finch, 3rd Earl of Aylesford. Heneage Legge and Arthur Legge were his younger brothers.

Career
Dartmouth was returned to Parliament as one of two representatives for Milborne Port at a by-election in January 1810. However, in November of the same year he succeeded his father in the earldom and took his seat in the House of Lords. He was admitted a Fellow of the Royal Society on 7 November 1822. He was also a Fellow of the Society of Antiquaries.

Like his father before him, Dartmouth served as an officer in the Staffordshire Militia, and was promoted to command it with the rank of Colonel in 1812. He was still colonel of the regiment at the time of his death.

Family
Lord Dartmouth was twice married.

He married firstly Lady Frances Charlotte Chetwynd-Talbot, daughter of Charles Chetwynd-Talbot, 2nd Earl Talbot, on 5 April 1820. They had one son:

 William Walter, 5th Earl of Dartmouth, b. 12 August 1823

Lady Frances died on 4 October 1823.

Lord Dartmouth married secondly the Honourable Frances Barrington, daughter of Reverend George Barrington, 5th Viscount Barrington, on 25 October 1828.  They had six sons and nine daughters. His children by his second wife were:

 Lady Frances Elizabeth Legge, b c1830,
 Lady Louisa Legge, b c1831,
 Hon. George Barrington Legge, b 19 December 1831,
 Lady Beatrix Maria Legge, b c1833,
 Hon. Edward Henry Legge, b 23 April 1834,
 Hon. Arthur Kaye Howard Legge, b c1835,
 Lady Katharine Legge, b c1837,
 Lady Florence Legge (1838–1917), who married Colonel Nathaniel Barnardiston and left several children
 Hon. Augustus Legge, b 28 November 1839, Bishop of Lichfield (1891–1913)
 Lady Barbara Caroline Legge, b 1841,
 Hon. Charles Gounter Legge, b 9 May 1842,
 Lady Charlotte Anne Georgiana Legge, b c1844,
 Hon. Heneage Legge, b 3 July 1845,
 Lady Harriet Octavia Legge, b 1 March 1847,
 Lady Wilhelmina Legge, b 1849.

The Countess of Dartmouth died on 12 August 1849.

Lord Dartmouth remained a widower until his death in November 1853, aged 68. He was succeeded in the earldom by his only child from his first marriage.

Other
Dartmouth was the litigant in the trust law case of Howe v Earl of Dartmouth (1802) 7 Ves 137.

References

External links
 

1784 births
1853 deaths
4
Fellows of the Royal Society
Lewisham, William Legge, Viscount
Lewisham, William Legge, Viscount
Staffordshire Militia officers
UK MPs who inherited peerages
William